Behnaq is a village in Sarajuy-ye Gharbi Rural District, in the Central District of Maragheh County, East Azerbaijan Province, Iran. At the 2006 census, its population was 897, in 165 families.

References 

Towns and villages in Maragheh County